Marina Vyacheslavovna Anissina (born 30 August 1975) is a Franco-Russian ice dancer. Competing with Gwendal Peizerat for France, she is the 2002 Olympic champion, the 1998 Olympic bronze medalist, the 2000 World champion, and a six-time French national champion.

Earlier in her career, Anissina competed with Ilia Averbukh for Russia and the Soviet Union. They won gold at two World Junior Championships.

Personal life
Born to Irina Cherniaeva, a former pair skater who placed sixth at the 1972 Winter Olympics, and Vyacheslav Anisin, a World and European champion in ice hockey, Anissina had a comfortable childhood. She is of Ukrainian descent on her mother's side. Her brother is Mikhail Anisin, also a hockey player.

Anissina became a French citizen in 1994. On 23 February 2008, she married Russian actor Nikita Djigurda in Moscow after the two met when they were partnered on a celebrity ice dancing television show. They have two children. The family currently lives in Moscow. Anissina spends time in France and works with young ice dancers.

Career

Early years
Born into an ice skating family, Anissina began skating at the age of four. By age nine she was determined to become a champion. Her mother, having been injured in pair skating, discouraged her from following in her footsteps so the young skater went into ice dancing.

Early in her career, Anissina competed with Sergei Sakhnovski, representing the Soviet Union. Following that partnership, she teamed up with Ilia Averbukh. They represented the Soviet Union and, after that country's dissolution, Russia. They were the 1990 and 1992 World Junior Champions. Their partnership ended at the end of the 1991–92 season; Averbukh decided to leave Anissina to skate with Irina Lobacheva with whom he had fallen in love.

Anissina trained for several months without a partner at the same rink as the new duo.
She received little help from the Russian federation in her search for a new partner. She and her mother studied videotapes of international competitions and selected Gwendal Peizerat and Victor Kraatz. Anissina sent letters to both but the one to Kraatz did not reach him. Peizerat did not respond immediately but when his partnership with Marina Morel fell apart, he contacted Anissina.

Partnership with Peizerat
Anissina arrived in Lyon, France, in February 1993, declaring her goal of becoming World and Olympic champion. She wanted to bring Peizerat back to Russia with her but his family was opposed.

Anissina settled in France and began learning the language but experienced homesickness. She focused intensely on skating and insisted her partner, who was dividing his time between skating and his education, be equally focused on their career. Their first year together produced many quarrels and they came close to splitting up. Their coach Muriel Boucher-Zazoui, however, immediately felt it was a promising partnership, saying "They are like fire and ice".

Anissina and Peizerat were selected for the 1994 Winter Olympics in Lillehammer but her French citizenship was granted a few weeks too late. The Olympics, unlike most skating competitions, require both partners to be citizens of the country they are representing.

Anissina and Peizerat won the 1998 Olympic bronze medal and 1998 and 1999 World silver medals behind Anjelika Krylova and Oleg Ovsyannikov. The Russians retired due to injury and Anissina and Peizerat then developed a rivalry with the Italians Barbara Fusar-Poli and Maurizio Margaglio.

The French won the 2000 European and World Championships. In 2001, Anissina and Peizerat won European and World silver behind the Italians but surged past them in 2002 to reclaim their European title and become the Olympic Champions.

At the 2002 Olympics, they led after the compulsory dances and the original dance. Their free dance, Liberty, mixed music with sections from the famed freedom speech by Martin Luther King Jr.; a 5–4 split of the judges' panel had them in first place in this segment ahead of Lobecheva and Averbukh, and they became the first French ice dancers to win the Olympic gold medal.

After the Olympics, Anissina and Peizerat retired from competition but continued skating together for many years in shows around the world. During their career, they represented the club Lyon TSC. Their signature move was Anissina lifting Peizerat off the ice, switching the traditional gender roles in lifts.

Anissina coached for several years in Marseille at S.O.G.M.A. 13. She has also done some choreography for other skaters. In 2013, she said she hoped to qualify for the 2014 Sochi Olympics with Peizerat.

Programs

With Peizerat

With Averbukh

Results

With Peizerat for France

With Averbukh for Russia and the Soviet Union

References

External links

http://www.peoples.ru/sport/fskating/anisina/ (in Russian)
http://mgforever.free.fr (in French)
Anissina/Peizerat (English)

Olympic figure skaters of France
1975 births
Living people
French female ice dancers
Russian female ice dancers
Figure skaters at the 1998 Winter Olympics
Figure skaters at the 2002 Winter Olympics
Olympic gold medalists for France
Olympic bronze medalists for France
Figure skaters from Moscow
Olympic medalists in figure skating
World Figure Skating Championships medalists
European Figure Skating Championships medalists
World Junior Figure Skating Championships medalists
Medalists at the 2002 Winter Olympics
Medalists at the 1998 Winter Olympics
Season-end world number one figure skaters
Russian people of Ukrainian descent
European champions for France